The real estate sector in Kenya has seen a boom that began somewhere in the mid to late 2000s because the property market is responding to increased demand.

In Nairobi, the capital and largest city of Kenya, there is one of the largest expatriate communities in the continent due to the significant number of multinationals who have chosen Nairobi as either their African hub or East and Central African hub. The rebirth of property development in Nairobi has attracted global attention. In its 2012 Wealth Report, real estate management company, Knight Frank, ranked Nairobi as the fastest-growing real estate market in the world, outpacing cities like Miami and Monaco. Real estate prices in Nairobi rose 25 per cent between January and December 2011. Nairobi was also voted as one of the top 10 cities to watch by global real estate firm, Jones Lang LaSalle, out of 150 cities globally.

Kenyan cities 

In 2012, Nairobi and Mombasa were the only cities in the "southern hemisphere" to have reported double digit property price increases, out of 71 cities surveyed in the Prime International Residential Index. The table shows property price growth in the top cities in the survey.

 Source: BusinessDaily

The report noted that inflows from Kenyans in the diaspora are particularly significant in driving the prices and that the cost per square metre of land in Nairobi and Mombasa is still lower than other cities such as Monaco.

Markets

Office 
The office market in Kenya has moved from a position of oversupply and the market is finally stabilising, as Nairobi reinforces its position as the regional commercial hub of Sub-Saharan Africa.

Retail 
Kenya continues to experience some of the most decentralised growth of the retail market as marketers move outside Nairobi and go to other urban centres in Kenya such as Mombasa, Kisumu, Eldoret and Nakuru.

Industrial 
Most industrial companies in Kenya tend to avoid renting or leasing space. However, over the recent years there has been significant development especially along Mombasa Rd. Rent and take up is low so the sector might need a couple more years to mature.

Residential 
The residential market has actually been one of the key drivers of the property market. There has been a significant number of development projects coming up both within the Greater Nairobi Area and other urban areas such as Mombasa, Naivasha and Kisumu.

Prime Global Cities Index

Q1 2013

Performance of luxury homes by world region 

Source: KnightFrank

Greater Nairobi and Nairobi Metro 

Greater Nairobi consists of 4 out of 47 counties in Kenya but the area generates about 60% of the nation's wealth. The counties are:

Nairobi (core)

Upper Hill 
Upper Hill has become an alternative for major companies seeking land cheaper than that which is in the Central Business District of Nairobi. It is one of the two main bases multinational firms consider when setting up in Kenya or Africa. Some of the firms include but are not limited to: Cisco Systems, Citibank, Coca-Cola, Huawei and IMF.

Average annual office rents for Grade A offices in Nairobi

 Source: KnightFrank

Westlands 
Westlands along with Upper Hill has become one of the two main bases for multinational firms that want to set up in Kenya or Africa. Some of the firms include but are not limited to: General Electric, Google Africa headquarters, Intel Corporation, LG and Standard Chartered Plc.

Gigiri 
Gigiri is home to Kenya's large expatriate community. It is one of the largest expat communities in Africa. It houses the United Nations Environmental Programme. Nairobi is the only African city to host a major UN body. It also has the Village Market, which targets the expat community in Nairobi and hosts the International Civil Aviation Organization Base for Eastern and Southern Africa. Gigiri is considered one of Kenya's most posh suburbs along with Runda and Muthaiga which are really close to the place.

It is comparable to the mostly-expat-inhabited neighbourhood of Itaewon in South Korea. However, it is much smaller.

Runda, Muthaiga, Lavington, Karen 
These areas are Kenya's most expensive neighbourhoods; however, it is very likely that the neighbourhoods like Runda will lose its tag due to the recent demolitions and others are seeing more and more townhouses rather than mansions and villas.

Machakos (East Metro) 

Towns in Machakos County on the outskirts of Nairobi from the 2000s been inhabited by people who work in Nairobi. Athi River is one town that has seen people move there. This shows that people have started to prefer living outside the core of the city. Under the Nairobi 2030 Masterplan, Machakos County is to become a dormitory town for Core Nairobi.

Konza Techno City 
Konza Technology City dubbed "Africa’s Silicon Valley" will be the single largest property development ever done in Kenya. It is going to host the technology city as part of many programmes that aim to steer Kenya into middle income status. It will cost a whooping US$14.5 billion after commencing in January 2013 and is to be completed by 2030.

Kiambu (North Metro) 
With the recent completion of the expansion of a Thika road connecting Core Nairobi to Kiambu County, there has been a lot of property development happening like Mi Vida Garden City Apartment with the most significant being.

Tatu City 
Tatu City is a property development by Moscow-based Renaissance Partners. The development will cost US$2.5 billion; groundbreaking commenced in early 2013.

Kajiado (South Metro) 
Kajiado County is currently home to Kenya's richest people. There are many residential neighbourhoods that host people who work in Nairobi examples are Ngong, Kitengela, Kiserian and Ongata Rongai. Kitengela is close to Athi River which has also started rising as a popular residential area.

Mombasa 
Mombasa is the second-largest city in Kenya. Prime land in Mombasa is up for grabs as a property boom like the one witnessed in the 1970s continues to push up home prices in the coastal town.

Nyali 
Nyali houses some of the most expensive homes in Kenya.

Shanzu 
Shanzu is also another affluent neighbourhood right past Whitesands beach hotel at Bamburi beach. The area houses high-profile housing developments.

English Point Marina 
English Point Marina will be East and Central Africa's first floating pontoon marina. It will offer apartment living in the comfort, luxury and security of a hotel and will be managed by Pinewood Village Beach Resort.
Units sold cost between KSh.36 – 150 million/= (US$410,000 – US$1.8 million). Despite the high prices, the units are almost sold out.

The total cost of the project is about KSh.4.8 billion/= (US$60 million).

 the project was 30% complete. A complete virtual tour of the property has been created to give online users a feel of what to expect from the development.

References

External links 
 Nairobi City
 Mombasa City
 Tatu City
 Konza City

Economy of Kenya
Populated places in Kenya
Kenya